The 1969–70 Hellenic Football League season was the 17th in the history of the Hellenic Football League, a football competition in England.

Premier Division

The Premier Division featured 15 clubs which competed in the division last season, along with three new clubs:
Buckingham Athletic, promoted from Division One
Cirencester Town, joined from the Gloucestershire County League
Oxford City reserves, promoted from Division One

League table

Division One

The Division One featured 16 clubs which competed in the division last season, along with 3 new clubs:
Aston Clinton, relegated from the Premier Division
Waddesdon, relegated from the Premier Division
AC Delco, joined from the South Midlands League Premier Division

League table

References

External links
 Hellenic Football League

1969-70
H